This is a collection of lists of mammal gestation period estimated by experts in their fields. The mammals included are only viviparous (marsupials and placentals) as some mammals, which are monotremes (including platypuses and echidnas) lay their eggs. A marsupial has a short gestation period, typically shorter than placental. For more information on how these estimates were ascertained, see Wikipedia’s articles on gestational age. 

The gestation figures given here are shown in days. They represent average values and should only be considered as approximations.

Factors affecting the gestation period in mammals 

There are several factors affecting the length of the gestation period in mammals.

Animal size/mass 

There is a positive relationship between mass at birth and length of gestation in eutherian mammals. Larger mammals are more likely to produce a well-developed neonate than small mammals. Large mammals develop at an absolute slower rate compared to small mammals. Thus, the large mammal tend have longer gestation periods than small mammal as they tend to produce larger neonate. Large mammals require a longer period of time to attain any proportion of adult mass compared to small mammals.

The level of development at birth 

More developed infants will typically require a longer gestation period. Altricial mammals needs less time to gestate compare to the precocial (well-developed neonate) mammal. A typical precocial mammal has a gestation period almost four times longer than a typical altricial mammal of the same body size. Precocial mammal species generally have greater adult body weights than altricial mammals as precocial mammals have markedly longer gestation periods than altricial mammals. The neonatal of larger mammals develop relatively more quickly and thus making it more likely that a large mammal would produce a more well-developed neonate as a consequence of its longer gestation period. In some cases, some mammal species may have similar gestation periods despite having significantly different body masses.

Environmental factor 

In response to the conditions of the environment, some mammals, such as bat delay the implantation due to the cold temperature in winter. Another factor is due to the shortage of food stocks during winter as the insects are being driven away and as the result, bat hibernate in pregnant condition.

In pinnipeds, the purpose of delayed implantation is in order to increase survival chance of the young animals as the mother ensure that the neonates are born at an optimal season.

See also 
 Gestation
 Evolution of mammals - Timing of placental evolution

References

Citations

Sources 

 Gestation, Incubation, and Longevity of Selected Animals
 David Crystal, The Cambridge Factfinder Cambridge: Cambridge University Press, 1998 (84).
 Online animal encyclopedia
 Study finds wide range in pregnancy length

Fertility
Midwifery